The 1973 England rugby union tour of Fiji and New Zealand was a series of matches played by the England national rugby union team in Fiji and New Zealand in August and September 1973. England played five games, including a test match against the New Zealand national rugby union team and a match against the Fiji national rugby union team for which England did not award full international caps. England beat Fiji by only a single point and lost all three matches against New Zealand provincial teams but completed the tour with their first win against New Zealand since 1936.

This tour was hastily organised when a planned tour of Argentina was cancelled due to terrorist threats against the players. A squad of 25 was selected, all but three capped, and nine of whom (six in the pack) had played in the match against the All Blacks at Twickenham nine months previously, in January 1973. David Duckham and Stack Stevens had been, with John Pullin, on the 1971 Lions tour.

Matches
Scores and results list England's points tally first.

Touring party

Manager: Sandy Sanders
Assistant Manager: John Elders
Captain: John Pullin (Bristol) 30 caps

Backs

Peter Rossborough (Coventry) 1 cap
Tony Jorden (Blackheath) 4 caps
David Duckham (Coventry) 24 caps
Geoff Evans (Coventry) 4 caps
Jeremy Janion (Richmond) 9 caps
Peter Knight (Bristol) 3 caps
Peter Preece (Coventry) 6 caps
Peter Squires (Harrogate) 2 caps
Martin Cooper (Moseley) 2 caps
Alan Old (Middlesbrough) 4 caps
Steve Smith (Sale) 3 caps
Jan Webster (Moseley) 5 caps

Forwards

Mike Burton (Gloucester) 5 caps
Fran Cotton (Coventry) 7 caps
Peter Hendy (St Ives) No caps
Nick Martin (Bedford) 1 cap
Tony Neary (Broughton Park) 16 caps
John Pullin (Bristol) 30 caps
Chris Ralston (Richmond) 12 caps
Andy Ripley (Rosslyn Park) 10 caps
Stack Stevens (Harlequins) 15 caps
Roger Uttley (Gosforth) 3 caps
John Watkins (Gloucester) 3 caps
John White (Bristol) No caps
Bob Wilkinson (Cambridge University) No caps

Notes 

Tour
1973 rugby union tours
Rugby union tours of Fiji
1973
tour